Federal Route 83, or Jalan Bandar Pusat Jengka, is the main federal roads in Bandar Pusat Jengka, Pahang, Malaysia. There are many FELDA settlements along this road.

Route background 
The Kilometre Zero of the Federal Route 83 starts at Jalan Temerloh-Maran junctions, at its interchange with the Federal Route 2, the main trunk road of the central of Peninsula Malaysia.

Features

At most sections, the Federal Route 83 was built under the JKR R5 road standard, allowing maximum speed limit of up to 90 km/h.

List of junctions and towns

References

083